The following radio stations broadcast on FM frequency 98.2 MHz:

China 
 Beijing Youth Radio in Beijing
 CNR The Voice of China in Meizhou

United Kingdom
 BBC Radio 1 in Borders, Bridgend, Great Glen, Hereford, Central Southern England, Lancs, Milton Keynes, Penicuik

References

Lists of radio stations by frequency